Drift Away is a 2021 French drama film written and directed by Xavier Beauvois. The film stars Jérémie Renier, Marie-Julie Maille and Victor Belmondo.

The film had its worldwide premiere at the 71st Berlin International Film Festival in March 2021. It is a Les Films du Worso production.

Cast
The cast include:
 Jérémie Renier as Laurent
 Marie-Julie Maille as Marie
 Victor Belmondo
 Iris Bry
 Geoffrey Sery as Julien
 Olivier Pequery
 Madeleine Beauvois

Release
On February 11, 2021, Berlinale announced that the film would have its worldwide premiere at the 71st Berlin International Film Festival in the Berlinale Competition section, in March 2021.

References

External links
 

2021 films
2020s French-language films
2021 drama films
French drama films
Les Films du Worso films
2020s French films